Professor John Ntambirweki is a lawyer, academic and academic administrator in Uganda, the third-largest economy in the East African Community. He is the current Vice Chancellor of Uganda Pentecostal University, a private university, which was accredited by the Uganda National Council for Higher Education in 2005.

Background
He was born in Mbarara District, in Western Uganda, circa 1955.

Education
He graduated with a  Bachelor of Laws from Makerere University, a Diploma In Law Practice from  Law Development Center. His degree of Master of Laws from the University of Nairobi.

Work history
John Ntambirweki is a former Senior Lecturer of Makerere University. He is also a former Head of Department of Law, Uganda Christian University.

Other considerations
John Ntambirweki is a Consultant at the law firm of Ntambirweki Kandeebe & Company Advocates, based in Kampala. Other advocates at the firm include Barbara Ntambirweki, a daughter to John Ntambirweki, and a Senior Lecturer in the Faculty of Law at Uganda Pentecostal University.

See also
 List of Universities in Uganda
 List of university leaders in Uganda
 List of business schools in Uganda
 Kabarole District

References

External links
Uganda Pentecostal University Students Allowed To Study Bar Course At LDC

Living people
Makerere University alumni
University of Nairobi alumni
People from Kabarole District
Toro people
Ugandan Christians
1945 births
Vice-chancellors of universities in Uganda
20th-century Ugandan lawyers
Law Development Centre alumni
Academic staff of Uganda Pentecostal University
21st-century Ugandan lawyers